Henry Temple, 2nd Viscount Palmerston, FRS (4 December 1739 – 17 April 1802), was a British politician.

Life
Temple was a son of Henry Temple (son of Henry Temple, 1st Viscount Palmerston) and Jane, daughter of Sir John Barnard, Lord Mayor of London.

He was born into 'the Ascendancy', the Anglo-Irish aristocracy. His family owned a vast country estate in the north of County Sligo in the west of Ireland. He succeeded to the peerage in 1757, and was educated at Clare College, Cambridge from 1757 to 1759.

As a member of the British House of Commons, he represented the constituencies of East Looe between 1762 and 1768, Southampton between 1768 and 1774, Hastings between 1774 and 1784, Boroughbridge between 1784 and 1790, Newport, Isle of Wight between 1790 and 1796, and Winchester between 1796 and his death in 1802.

He was appointed to the Board of Trade in 1765, was a Lord Commissioner of the Admiralty between 1766 and 1777, and was a Lord of the Treasury from 1777 to 1782.

In 1763 Temple journeyed to Italy, staying with Voltaire at Ferney en route. He reached Rome in 1764, and from there visited Paestum, south of Naples. He bought antiquities and paintings from Gavin Hamilton, antiquities from Giovanni Battista Piranesi, paintings from Angelica Kauffman, cameos from Giovanni Pichler and sculpture from Joseph Nollekens.

He died on 17 April 1802 at his house in Hanover Square, Westminster, and was buried at Romsey Abbey with a monument by John Flaxman.

He left behind his wife and children. His son, Henry John Temple, 3rd Viscount Palmerston, was Prime Minister of the United Kingdom in the mid-19th century.

A portrait of Henry Temple by Angelica Kauffman is held at Broadlands, Hampshire.

Arms

References

Further reading
Brian Connell, Portrait of a Whig Peer. Compiled from the papers of the Second Viscount Palmerston 1739 – 1802 (1957. London)

Palmerston, Henry Temple, 2nd Viscount
Palmerston, Henry Temple, 2nd Viscount
Palmerston, Henry Temple, 2nd Viscount
Members of the Parliament of Great Britain for English constituencies
Palmerston, Henry Temple, 2nd Viscount
Palmerston, Henry Temple, 2nd Viscount
Palmerston, Henry Temple, 2nd Viscount
Palmerston, Henry Temple, 2nd Viscount
Palmerston, Henry Temple, 2nd Viscount
Palmerston, Henry Temple, 2nd Viscount
Palmerston, Henry Temple, 2nd Viscount
Palmerston, Henry Temple, 2nd Viscount
Palmerston
Palmerston, Henry Temple, 2nd Viscount
Palmerston, Henry Temple, 2nd Viscount
Palmerston, 2nd Viscount
Palmerston, Henry Temple, 2nd Viscount
Parents of prime ministers of the United Kingdom
Viscounts Palmerston
Lords of the Admiralty